A list of American films released in 1900.

See also
 1900 in the United States

External links
 
1900 films at the Internet Movie Database

1900
Films
 American
1900s in American cinema